Bryan Chang or Chang Shu-hao (born 22 October 1988) is a Taiwanese actor. He won the award for Best Actor in a Miniseries or Television Film at the Golden Bell Awards in 2007.

Filmography

Television series

Film

Variety show

Music video

Discography

Soundtrack album

Awards and nominations

References

External links 
 
 
 

1988 births
Living people
21st-century Taiwanese male actors
Male actors from Taipei
Taiwanese male film actors
Taiwanese male television actors